Pleorotus was a monotypic genus of Seychelloise huntsman spiders containing the single species, Pleorotus braueri. It was first described by Eugène Louis Simon in 1898, and was endemic to the Seychelles. The description was based on a single male collected on Mahe Island in 1894, but none have been found in later collections, and it has been declared extinct.

See also
 List of Sparassidae species

References

Further reading

Extinct arachnids
Extinct invertebrates since 1500
Fauna of Seychelles
IUCN Red List extinct species
Monotypic Araneomorphae genera
Sparassidae
Spiders of Africa